The 2017 Malaysian motorcycle Grand Prix was the seventeenth round of the 2017 MotoGP season. It was held at the Sepang International Circuit in Sepang on 29 October 2017.

Classification

MotoGP

 Álex Rins was disqualified for taking a shortcut to enter the pit lane following a crash.

Moto2
Franco Morbidelli sealed the Moto2 title before the race started on Sunday after Thomas Lüthi was declared unfit and unable to start the race following a qualifying crash that left him with a broken ankle.

 Thomas Lüthi did not start the race following a crash at the end of qualifying that left him injured, whilst both Kiefer Racing riders Tarran Mackenzie and Dominique Aegerter withdrew following the death of team boss Stefan Kiefer on October 27.

Moto3

Championship standings after the race

MotoGP
Below are the standings for the top five riders and constructors after round seventeen has concluded.

Riders' Championship standings

Constructors' Championship standings

 Note: Only the top five positions are included for both sets of standings.

Moto2

Moto3

Notes

References

Malaysia
Motorcycle Grand Prix
2016
Malaysian motorcycle